Monardella leucocephala is a believed-to-be-extinct flowering plant in the genus Monardella. The plant has stems 6–8 inches long with small white flowers.

References

leucocephala